The Louis Blériot medal is an aviation honor awarded by the Fédération Aéronautique Internationale (FAI), the international aviation record adjudicating body. The medal may be awarded up to three times every year to record setters in speed, altitude and distance categories in light aircraft. The award was established by 1936 in honor of Louis Blériot.

Award recipients
2008   Stéphane Deregnaucour
2007	not awarded
2006	not awarded
2005	Dick Rutan, distance, XCOR EZ-Rocket
2004	Robert L. Gibson, speed over a closed course in a Cassutt IIM
2003	Bruce Bohannon
2003	Bruce Bohannon
2002	Bruce Bohannon
2001	Bruce Bohannon
2001	Richard C. Keyt
2000	Hans Georg Schmid
1999	Peter Scheichenberger
1998	Jon M. Sharp, Sharp Nemesis
1997	not awarded
1996	James A. Price
1996	Jon M. Sharp, Sharp Nemesis
1995	not awarded
1994	Dan E. Parisieu
1993	Jon M. Sharp, Sharp Nemesis
1992	Michael S. Arnold
1992	David W. Timms
1991	Peter Scheichenberger
1991	Robert L. Gibson, altitude in horizontal flight
1991	Peter Urach
1990	not awarded
1989	Eric Scott Winton
1989	Richard J. Gritter
1989	Kirk D. Hanna
1988	Wilhelm Lischak
1988	Yves Duval
1987	Norman E. Howell
1986	Wilhelm Lischak
1985	John E. Saum
1984	F. Gary Hertzler
1984	Richard Flohr
1983	Phillip C. Fogg
1982	A.J. Smith
1981	Dick Rutan
1980	Charles Andrews
1979	Gerald G. Mercer
1978	not awarded
1977	Oleg A. Boulyguine
1976	W.M. Pomeroy
1976	Rodney T. Nixon
1975	Edgar J. Lesher
1974	not awarded
1973	Edgar J. Lesher
1972	Roy Windover
1971	not awarded
1970	Edgar J. Lesher
1969	Hal Fishman
1969	Barry Schiff
1968	Donald C. Sinclair
1967	Edgar J. Lesher
1966	William C. Brodbeck
1966	Raymond Davy
1965	Geraldine "Jerrie" Mock
1964	Adriano Mantelli
1963	Raymond Davy
1962	Adriano Mantelli
1961	not awarded
1960	Raymond Davy
1959	not awarded
1958	not awarded
1957	Kaarl Henrik & Juhani Heinonen
1956	Richard V. Ohm
1956	L. Stastny
1956	F. Novak
1955	Peder Ib Riborg Andersen
1954	Iginio Guagnellini
1953	William D. Thompson
1953	Iginio Guagnellini
1952	Max Conrad
1951	Caro Bayley
1951	A. Rebillon
1950	John F. Mann
1950	R.R. Paine
1949	René Leduc
1949	William P. Odom
1949	Anna Bodriaguina
1948	not awarded
1947	not awarded
1946	not awarded
1945	not awarded
1944	not awarded
1943	not awarded
1942	not awarded
1940	not awarded
1939	not awarded
1938	André Japy
1938	Helmut Kalkstein
1938	Steve Wittman
1937	not awarded
1936	Stanisław Skarżyński
1936	Maurice Arnoux
1936	Furio Niclot Doglio
1936	Mrs. Becker (France)

References

External links
FAI Louis Blériot medal website

Aviation awards
Aviation records